LeUyen Pham (born September 7, 1973) is a children's book illustrator and author. She has illustrated and written more than 120 books. In 2020, she won a Caldecott Honor for her illustrations in the book Bear Came Along.

Life and career
Pham was born in Saigon, Vietnam on September 7, 1973. She attended the University of California, Los Angeles from 1991 to 1993, and graduated with a B.A. in 1996 from the Art Center College of Design. After college, she worked as a layout artist from 1996 to 1999 at Dreamworks Animation. She then quit to illustrate children's books full-time.

Pham's first illustrated book, Sugarcane House, and Other Stories about Mr. Fat, was written by Adrienne Moore Bond and published in 1997. In 2000, the book Can You Do This, Old Badger? was published, with illustrations by Pham and writing by Eve Bunting. The book won an Oppenheim Toy Portfolio Gold Award. In 2004, the book Twenty-One Elephants, illustrated by Pham and written by Phil Bildner, also won an Oppenheim Toy Portfolio Gold Award.

Pham's writing debut was in 2005 with her children's book Big Sister, Little Sister. The book is narrated by a younger girl who compares herself to her older sister, with their sibling affection showing more as the story progresses. It contains ink brush illustrations and additions of digitally-produced color. The book received positive reviews, with Linda Ludke in the School Library Journal commenting that “with warmth and good humor, the ups and downs of sisterly love are perfectly conveyed.”

Pham is the illustrator of the Princess in Black children's book series. The series is written by Shannon Hale and Dean Hale, with the first book published in 2014. In their Princess in Black book review, Publishers Weekly said Pham “offers little jolts of energy and wit on every page, with full-page and spot illustrations that have the vivaciousness and irreverence of contemporary animation.”

Pham co-created the graphic novels Real Friends and Best Friends with author Shannon Hale. In 2020, she was awarded a Caldecott Honor for her illustrations in the book Bear Came Along.

In April 2020, Pham, Shannon Hale and Dean Hale released a short, free ebook called The Princess in Black and the Case of the Coronavirus to share tips on fighting COVID-19 in an understandable way for children. In 2020, Pham was working on a book with Shannon Hale called Itty Bitty Kittycorn, scheduled to be published in March 2021.

Through her collaborations with Hale, Pham has been shortlisted for four AML Awards, winning one (for Real Friends) and receiving an honorable mention (for the first Princess in Black book)—making her perhaps the only person unassociated with the Latter-day Saint faith so often recognized.

Personal life
On October 29, 2005, Pham married artist Alexandre Puvilland.

Selected works

Standalone books
Can You Do This, Old Badger? (2000) illustrator; written by Eve Bunting
Whose Shoes? (2001) illustrator; written by Anna Grossnickle Hines
Piggies in a Polka (2003) – illustrator; written by Kathi Appelt
Twenty-One Elephants (2004) – illustrator; written by Phil Bildner
Sing-Along Song (2004) – illustrator; written by JoAnn Early Macken
Big Sister, Little Sister (2005) – author & illustrator
Hanukkah, Shmanukkah! (2005) – illustrator; written by Esmé Raji Codell
Grace for President (2008) – illustrator; Written by Kelly DiPucchio
God's Dream (2008) – illustrator; Written by Archbishop Desmond Tutu and Douglas Carlton Abrams
Templar (2013) – co-illustrator; Written by Jordan Mechner
The Boy Who Loved Math (2013) – illustrator; Written by Deborah Heiligman
Bo at Ballard Creek (2013) – illustrator; Written by Kirkpatrick Hill
The Bear Who Wasn't There (2016) – author & illustrator
Isabella For Real (2016) – author; Written by Margie Palatini
Bear Came Along (2019) – illustrator; written by Richard T. Morris, winner of the Caldecott Honor Award
Grace Goes to Washington (2019) – illustrator; Written by Kelly DePucchio
Love is Powerful (2020) – illustrator; written by Heather Dean Brewer
Outside Inside (2021) – Author & Illustrator

Freckleface Strawberry Series
Illustrated by Pham and written by Julianne Moore
Freckleface Strawberry (2007)
Freckleface Strawberry and the Dodgeball Bully (2009)
Freckleface Strawberry: Best Friends Forever (2011)
Freckleface Strawberry: Loose Tooth! (2016)

Princess in Black series
Illustrated by Pham and written by Shannon Hale and Dean Hale
The Princess in Black (2014)
The Princess in Black and the Perfect Princess Party (2015)
The Princess in Black and the Hungry Bunny Horde (2016)
The Princess in Black Takes a Vacation (2016)
The Princess in Black and the Mysterious Playdate (2016)
The Princess in Black and the Science Fair Scare (2018)
The Princess in Black and the Bathtime Battle (2019)
The Princess in Black and the Giant Problem (2020)
The Princess in Black and the Mermaid Princess (2022)

Real Friends series
Co-created by Pham and Shannon Hale
Real Friends (2017)
Best Friends (2019)
Friends Forever (2021)

Vampirina Ballerina series 
Illustrated by Pham and written by Anne Marie Pace
Vampirina Ballerina (2012)
Vampirina Ballerina Hosts a Sleepover (2013)
Vampirina at the Beach (2017)
Vampirina in the Snow (2018)

Alvin Ho series 
Illustrated by Pham and written by Lenore Look

 Alvin Ho: Allergic to Girls, School, and Other Scary Things (2009)
 Alvin Ho: Allergic to Camping, Hiking, and Other Natural Disasters (2010)
Alvin Ho: Allergic to Birthday Parties, Science Projects, and Other Man-made Catastrophes (2011)
Alvin Ho: Allergic to Dead Bodies, Funerals, and Other Fatal Circumstances (2012)
Alvin Ho: Allergic to Babies, Burglars, and Other Bumps in the Night (2014)
Alvin Ho: Allergic to the Great Wall, the Forbidden Palace, and Other Tourist Attractions (2015)

References

University of California, Los Angeles alumni
1973 births
American children's book illustrators
Vietnamese children's book illustrators
Vietnamese emigrants to the United States
American women children's writers
Vietnamese women children's writers
People from Ho Chi Minh City
American illustrators
American women illustrators
Vietnamese illustrators
Vietnamese women illustrators
Living people
American children's writers
Vietnamese children's writers
American writers of Vietnamese descent
Caldecott Honor winners